"The Damage" is a song by British neo-progressive rock band Marillion which appeared on their 13th studio album, Marbles, released in May 2004. In October 2005, a one-disc live album containing a subset of the full two-disc studio version entitled Marbles Live was released to retail shops in the UK. The recording was made at the London Astoria in July 2004. To promote this album, the track "The Damage" was made available as a digital download; it is thus the third song to be released from Marbles and the only track to be released from Marbles Live. Download-only releases were not yet eligible to chart on the UK Singles Chart at the time, but the single did reach #2 on the UK Official Download Chart. There was no physical release available, but a one-track CD version was sent out as a promo (source of cover art).

Track list
"The Damage" (live) – 4:05

External links
Music video on Marillion's official YouTube channel

Personnel
 Steve Hogarth – vocals
 Mark Kelly – keyboards
 Ian Mosley – drums
 Steve Rothery – guitar
 Pete Trewavas – bass guitar

Chart positions

References

Marillion songs
2005 singles
2004 songs
Songs written by Steve Hogarth
Songs written by Steve Rothery
Songs written by Mark Kelly (keyboardist)
Songs written by Pete Trewavas
Songs written by Ian Mosley